Zukhra Sibgatovna Valeeva (born 12 October 1947) is a Russian master builder who has been the foreperson of the painters of the Komsomol Youth Brigade since 1968. Under her guidance, the company has  constructed five-story buildings and then moved on to building schools, kindergartens, the Sports Palace, a department store and whole neighbourhoods in the city of Ufa. Valeeva was an elected deputy of the Congress of People's Deputies of the Soviet Union from the Communist Party of the Soviet Union from 1989 to 1991. She has been decorated with the Jubilee Medal "In Commemoration of the 100th Anniversary of the Birth of Vladimir Ilyich Lenin"; the Medal "For Labour Valour"; the Order of Labour Glory and the Medal "Veteran of Labour".

Biography
Valeeva was born in the village of Turbasly, Iglinsky District, Bashkir Autonomous Soviet Socialist Republic on 12 October 1947, moving to the small city of Ufa. When she was a child, she wanted to be a teacher but was never able to achieve her ambition. Valeeva graduated from the GPTU No. 17 in Ufa in 1965 and began her working life as a painter at the construction department No. 3 of the Ufa design and construction association for large-panel housing construction. She painted balconies and plastered walls at Prospekt Oktyabrya when she was a student.

In 1968, Valeeva's skills of discipline, organisational abilities and engagement with improving quality enabled her to be employed as the foreman of the painters of the Komsomol Youth Brigade. She was frequently engaged with the improvement in quality, and bettering the technology of the work of painting to make it easier, quicker and simpler to complete jobs. Valeeva's team briefly constructed five-story buildings and then moved on to building schools, kindergartens, the Sports Palace, the first department store in Ufa and whole neighbourhoods. She was able to master large-panel housing construction. She did not seek promotion and remained the company's foreperson.

Valeeva was a member of the Communist Party of the Soviet Union, and was active in public life of the construction department. She was an member of the Bashkir Regional Committee of the Communist Party of the Soviet Union, and from 1989 to 1991, served as an elected deputy of the Congress of People's Deputies of the Soviet Union from the Communist Party of the Soviet Union. Valeeva was also a member of the Supreme Soviet of the Bashkir Autonomous Soviet Socialist Republic and the local Supreme Soviets. She was a delegate to the 19th All-Union Conference of the Communist Party of the Soviet Union in 1988.

Awards
Valeeva received multiple awards for her work and participation in public life. In 1970, she was decorated with the Jubilee Medal "In Commemoration of the 100th Anniversary of the Birth of Vladimir Ilyich Lenin"; the Medal "For Labour Valour" in 1974; the Order of Labour Glory, Third Class in 1977, which was upgraded to the Second Class in 1986 and the Medal "Veteran of Labour" in 1985.

References

1947 births
Living people
People from Bashkortostan
20th-century Russian women
21st-century Russian women
Builders
Communist Party of the Soviet Union members
Russian women in politics
Soviet women in politics
Members of the Congress of People's Deputies of the Soviet Union
Recipients of the Order of Labour Glory